Saare may refer to:

Places in Estonia
Saare County (also known as Saaremaa), one of 15 counties of Estonia
Saaremaa Parish, municipality in Saare County
Saare Parish, former municipality in Jõgeva County
Saare, Lääne County, village in Lääne-Nigula Parish, Lääne County
Saare, Pärnu County, village in Lääneranna Parish, Pärnu County
Saare, Tartu Parish, village in Tartu Parish, Tartu County, on the island of Piirissaar
Saare, Elva Parish, village in Elva Parish, Tartu County

Other
Saare (snack), a snack given to a groom after wedding

See also
Sääre (disambiguation), several places in Estonia